The 55th World Science Fiction Convention (Worldcon), also known as LoneStarCon 2, also known as "The Second Occasional LoneStarCon Science Fiction Convention & Chili Cook-off", was held on 28 August–1 September 1997 at the Marriott Rivercenter, Marriott Riverwalk, and the Henry B. Gonzalez Convention Center in San Antonio, Texas, United States.

The supporting organization was the Austin Literary Arts Maintenance Organization (ALAMO). The chairman was Karen Meschke.

Participants 

Attendance was 4,634, out of 5,614 paid memberships.

Guests of Honor 

 Algis Budrys (pro)
 Michael Moorcock (pro)
 Don Maitz (artist)
 Roy Tackett (fan)
 Neal Barrett, Jr. (toastmaster)

Awards

1997 Hugo Awards 

 Best Novel: Blue Mars by Kim Stanley Robinson
 Best Novella: "Blood of the Dragon" by George R. R. Martin
 Best Novelette: "Bicycle Repairman" by Bruce Sterling
 Best Short Story: "The Soul Selects Her Own Society: Invasion and Repulsion: A Chronological Reinterpretation of Two of Emily Dickinson's Poems: A Wellsian Perspective" by Connie Willis
 Best Non-Fiction Book: Time and Chance: an Autobiography by L. Sprague de Camp
 Best Dramatic Presentation: "Severed Dreams" (Babylon 5 episode)
 Best Professional Editor: Gardner Dozois
 Best Professional Artist: Bob Eggleton
 Best Semiprozine: Locus, edited by Charles N. Brown
 Best Fanzine: Mimosa, edited by Nicki Lynch & Rich Lynch
 Best Fan Writer: Dave Langford
 Best Fan Artist: William Rotsler

Other awards 

 John W. Campbell Award for Best New Writer: Michael A. Burstein

Notes 

The first LoneStarCon, held in Austin, Texas, had been the North American Science Fiction Convention (NASFiC) in 1985, when the 43rd Worldcon was held in Australia.

See also 

 Hugo Award
 Science fiction
 Speculative fiction
 World Science Fiction Society
 Worldcon

References

External links 

 LoneStarCon 2, the 1997 Worldcon: Internet Information Center
 NESFA.org: The Long List
 NESFA.org: 1997 convention notes 
 Hugo.org: 1997 Hugo Awards

1997 conferences
1997 in Texas
1997 in the United States
Conventions in Texas
Culture of San Antonio
Science fiction conventions in the United States
Worldcon